Passport to Shame, also known as Room 43, is a 1958 British drama film directed by Alvin Rakoff, written by Patrick Alexander and starring Diana Dors and Herbert Lom.

Premise
A young French woman becomes embroiled in a life of prostitution. Nick Biaggi (Herbert Lom) has a number of business interests, none of them honest. He runs a finance company that provides unsecured loans to naïve young women. This serves as a facade so that he can manipulate these women into his real business, prostitution . He recruits many of these women from abroad. To get them passports he has to find "husbands" for them within marriages of convenience. He has found a suitable husband for  his newest recruit, Marie Louise (Malou) Beaucaire (Odile Versois). Johnny McVey (Eddie Constantine)  is a Canadian cab driver and former soldier who has just borrowed a substantial amount of money  from Nick’s finance company: however, Johnny doesn’t know that this is the case at the onset. Nick assists Johnny so that he can repay  the loan, and mentions  that Johnny could also make a further  two hundred pounds  through a marriage of convenience to  a young French woman who really needs a passport. The marriage would be annulled after she has obtained the document. There would be no further obligations. Johnny is an honourable man, but not a naïve one. He realises what the ruse  is meant to conceal. Nick acts as a procurer for female  prostitutes, (or those who can be manipulated into that profession), but he needs British passports for these women. After they have obtained these, they cannot be deported once they start engaging in street sex work. Johnny is blasé about what will follow, as he regards himself as cynical and hardboiled. When he meets Malou he assumes that she is already a prostitute . He is amused when Malou tells him that she is still an innocent young woman.

Malou believes that she has been hired as a companion to an upper class British woman. Nick has established her  in a nice house and she has been given pleasant outfits to wear. Furthermore, there is  another young woman who lives  in the same house, Vicki (Diana Dors). Malou is under the impression that  Vicki is also a respectable. She  has no idea about Vicki's actual profession, nor how she affords the fashionable clothes that  she wears. Malou still has no idea about her ultimate prospects. However, she starts to suspect Nick's actual objectives for her once she looks inside Room 43, and sees the lingerié that  Vicki wears underneath her clothes. Malou realises that 'respectable' women do not wear undergarments like that. Then Nick explains his actual objectives for Malou. However, Johnny has been re-evaluating his own initial impressions of Malou, and doesn’t like his conclusions. He does not like the idea  of Malou, his erstwhile wife,  as a sex worker and recruits his fellow cab drivers to locate and rescue her. Nick blackmails Malou into engaging in street sex work, and threatens her with disfigurement if she doesn't comply. After being forced to smoke cannabis, Malou undergoes an hallucinatory dream sequence, only to find that she has inadvertently killed a client, according to her captors and is pressured into becoming a streetwalker by Nick and Aggie.

Fortunately, Johnny and his cabdriver associates have located the unwilling and reluctant Malou and rescue her from the street. However, Johnny's cab is then pursued by Nick's gangster henchmen. but manages to elude them. Malou explains her situation to Johnny, who reassures her that she is safe. Subsequently, though, Nick and his criminal associates recapture Malou and assault Johnny, while fellow cab driver Mike and Vicki grow closer. Mike discovers Johnny in his demolished flat. Aggie suggests that Malou should be sent back to France, while it is also suggested that she should be murdered. Vicki and Aggie are horrified when Nick agrees to this 'solution' to Malou's plight. When Vicki's disfigured sister takes her own life, she finally breaks with Nick altogether and tells Johnny about where Nick is keeping Malou captive. Johnny disguises himself and enters the premises to rescue Malou once more, while Vicki lures Malou's guard away through seductive behaviour and then knocks him out with a bottle blow to the head.  Meanwhile, cabdrivers converge on Nick's bordello and fight a pitched battle against Nick's gangster associates while Vicki, Johnny and Malou flee from Nick, in pursuit but a fire breaks out. Nick falls to his death, but Johnny has saved Malou and Vicki has decided to quit prostitution as a consequence of her experiences, and settles down with Mike

Cast
 Diana Dors as Vicki 
 Herbert Lom as Nick Biaggi 
 Eddie Constantine as Johnny McVey 
 Odile Versois as Marie Louise 'Malou' Beaucaire  
 Brenda de Banzie as Aggie 
 Robert Brown as Mike 
 Elwyn Brook-Jones as Solicitor Heath
 Jackie Collins as English girl 
 Lana Morris as Girl 
 Steve Plytas as French Restaurant Manager 
 Cyril Shaps as Willie
 Denis Shaw as Mac
 Margaret Tyzack as June, Heath's secretary
 Joan Sims as  Miriam, Phone operator in the taxi office 
 Pauline Stroud as Maria 
 Michael Caine as Man getting married (uncredited) 
 Anne Reid as Woman getting married (uncredited)
 Maurice Bush as client, dream sequence (uncredited)
 Emil Stemler as waiter (uncredited)

Production 
"This was not a low budget film," said director Alvin Rakoff, "this was a lowest budget film." When the lighting cut out during a key scene, the filming had to continue.

The film introduced new talent, such as Michael Caine in an uncredited role, Jackie Collins, later an acclaimed novelist, and Joan Sims.

Nicolas Roeg, director of Don't Look Now and The Man Who Fell to Earth was the camera operator. Alvin Rakoff, a renowned television director, took on directing duties, despite knowing that it would be an exploitation film, because he wished to work in motion pictures.

This was Eddie Constantine's first English-language film.

Filming began on 3 July 1958.

The film was also known as Visa to Shame and One Way Street.

Reception
The Los Angeles Times said "the picture is rather well done."

The Monthly Film Bulletin called it a "wildly incredible story" which "... must be the most wholeheartedly absurd prostitute drama yet. Motivations are mysterious and characterisations grotesque. Connoisseurs of the bizarre may relish some of the production's most ambitious moments."

Variety said, "Though a familiar entry in characters and general action, it has a plus in fairly unfettered looks at prostitution in London and the workings of a white slave ring. It looks to have exploitation facets for Yank dualer chances and its “X” certificate in England should also help at the boxoffice. "

Filmink thought Dors was better than the female lead.

References

External links
 
 
Passport to Shame at Screenonline
Passport to Shame at BFI
Passport to Shame at TCMDB
Passport to Shame at Letterbox DVD
Passport to Shame a BFI
Review of film at Spinning Image

1958 films
British drama films
1958 drama films
London Films films
Films set in London
Films about prostitution in the United Kingdom
Films directed by Alvin Rakoff
1950s English-language films
1950s British films